Bijayananda Biswaal better known as Bijay Biswaal is an Indian painter and artist. He worked as a Chief Ticket Inspector at Indian Railways at Nagpur. He voluntarily retired from Indian Railways to continue painting.

Early life
Bijay was born at Pallahara in the Angul district of the Indian state of Odisha.

Work 
Bijay Biswaal's work is mainly comprised on Indian railway and mainly themed on the rural life of India.

Awards 
Biswaal was felicitated by the Government of Odisha for his painting works. He also got a special mention in the show Mann Ki Baat by Narendra Modi for his paintings.

References 

1964 births
Indian male painters
People from Angul district
20th-century Indian painters
Painters from Odisha
Living people
20th-century Indian male artists